Splash (stylized as SPLASH) is the first studio album by Japanese singer Satomi Fukunaga. It was released on November 14, 1986 through Canyon Records.

Track listing 
All tracks arranged by Masaaki Ōmura except track 2 arranged by Jun Satō and tracks 3 & 9 arranged by Hitoshi Minowa.

Personnel 

 Norio Sakai – bass
 Kenji Takamizu – bass
 Chiharu Mikuzuki – bass
 Eiji Shimamura – drums
 Shōji Fujii – drums
 Hideo Yamaki – drums
 Haruo Kubota – guitar
 Tsuyoshi Kon – guitar
 Takeshi Nishiyama – guitar
 Masaki Matsubara – guitar
 Masaaki Ōmura – keyboard
 Nobuo Kurata – keyboard
 Jun Satō – keyboard
 Haruo Togashi – keyboard
 Akira Nishimoto – keyboard
 Hitoshi Minowa – keyboard
 Nobu Saitō – percussion
 Hitoshi Anbai – programming
 Keiji Urata – programming
 Hideki Matsutake – programming
 Jake H. Conception – sax
 Katō Strings – strings
 Yasuhiro Kido – backing vocals
 BUZZ – backing vocals
 Kiyoshi Hiyama – backing vocals
 Etsuko Yamakawa – backing vocals

1986 albums
Satomi Fukunaga albums